James Owens (born July 5, 1955) is a former professional American football player who played six seasons in the National Football League (NFL) for the San Francisco 49ers and the Tampa Bay Buccaneers.

Owens competed at the 1976 Summer Olympics in Montreal in the 110 meter hurdles, finishing sixth.

External links
 http://www.nicholasmooneyhan.com/epguidearchive/cardsharks86/eubankscs1.html
 http://www.nfl.com/player/jamesowens/2522621/profile
 https://www.pro-football-reference.com/players/O/OwenJa00.htm

1955 births
Living people
American football running backs
American male hurdlers
Athletes (track and field) at the 1976 Summer Olympics
Olympic track and field athletes of the United States
Players of American football from Sacramento, California
San Francisco 49ers players
Tampa Bay Buccaneers players
Track and field athletes from Sacramento, California
Track and field athletes in the National Football League
UCLA Bruins football players
UCLA Bruins men's track and field athletes